Tab Benoit (born November 17, 1967) is an American blues guitarist, musician, and singer. His playing combines a number of blues styles, primarily Delta blues.

He plays a stock 1972 Fender Telecaster Thinline electric guitar and writes his own musical compositions. Benoit graduated from Vandebilt Catholic High School in Houma, Louisiana in May 1985.  In 2003, he formed "Voice of the Wetlands," an organization promoting awareness of coastal wetlands preservation.

Career

Early years
A guitar player since his teenage years, Benoit appeared at the Blues Box, a music club and cultural center in Baton Rouge run by guitarist Tabby Thomas. Playing guitar alongside Thomas, Raful Neal, Henry Gray, and other high-profile regulars at the club, Benoit learned the blues first-hand from a faculty of living blues legends. He formed a trio in 1987 and began playing clubs in Baton Rouge and New Orleans. He began touring other parts of the South two years later and started touring more of the United States in 1991.  Today he continues to perform across the country.

Benoit was featured in the IMAX film, Hurricane on the Bayou.

Development as an artist 
Benoit landed a recording contract with Texas-based Justice Records and released a series of recordings, beginning in 1992 with Nice and Warm. These Blues Are All Mine was released on Vanguard in 1999 after Justice folded.

That same year, Benoit appeared on Homesick for the Road, a collaborative album on the Telarc label with fellow guitarists Kenny Neal and Debbie Davies. Homesick not only served as a showcase for three relatively young musicians, but also launched Benoit's relationship with Telarc, which came to fruition in 2002 with the release of Wetlands.

On Wetlands, Benoit mixed original material such as the autobiographical "When a Cajun Man Gets the Blues" and "Fast and Free" with Professor Longhair's "Her Mind Is Gone" and Otis Redding's "These Arms of Mine".

Later in 2002, Benoit released Whiskey Store, a collaborative recording with fellow guitarist and Telarc labelmate Jimmy Thackery, harpist Charlie Musselwhite, and the Double Trouble rhythm section consisting of bassist Tommy Shannon and drummer Chris Layton.

In 2003, Benoit released Sea Saint Sessions, recorded at Big Easy Recording Studio in New Orleans. In addition to Benoit and his regular crew, bassist Carl Dufrene and drummer Darryl White, Sea Saint Sessions included guest appearances by Big Chief Monk Boudreaux, Cyril Neville, Brian Stoltz, and George Porter Jr. That same year, Benoit and Thackery took their dueling guitar show on the road, and recorded a March 2003 performance at the Unity Centre for Performing Arts in Unity, Maine. The result was Whiskey Store Live, released in February 2004.

Benoit's 2005 release was Fever for the Bayou, which also included guest appearances by Cyril Neville (vocals and percussion) and Big Chief Monk Boudreaux (vocals). In 2006, Benoit recorded Brother to the Blues with Louisiana's LeRoux. It was nominated for a Grammy Award for Best Traditional Blues Album. His cover of Buddy Miller's "Shelter Me" was the theme song for the Discovery Channel TV-series, Sons of Guns. In April 2011 Benoit released Medicine, featuring Anders Osborne, Michael Doucet of Beausoleil, and Ivan Neville.

Honors
In 2007, Benoit won his first B.B. King Entertainer of the Year award presented by the Blues Music Awards, described variously as "the highest accolade afforded musicians and songwriters in Blues music" and "[t]he premier blues music event in the world".

Benoit was inducted into The Louisiana Music Hall of Fame (LMHOF) on May 16, 2010, at the LMHOF Louisiana Music Homecoming in Erwinville, Louisiana.

In 2012, Benoit won three separate Blues Music Awards: Contemporary Blues Male Artist; Contemporary Blues Album (for 2011's Medicine); and for the second time, B.B. King Entertainer of the Year.

2013 saw Benoit win the Blues Music Awards Contemporary Blues Male Artist for the second year in a row.

Business ventures and activism
Benoit became owner of Tab Benoit's Lagniappe Music Cafe, situated in the downtown district of Houma, Louisiana.

Benoit has also been involved in conservation efforts on behalf of Louisiana wetlands. He is the founder of 'Voice of the Wetlands,' an organization promoting awareness of the receding coastal wetlands of Louisiana. In 2010, Benoit received the Governor's Award – Conservationist of the Year for 2009 by the Louisiana Wildlife Federation. He uses his music to promote the issues that plague Louisiana's imperiled coast to his national audience. One reason he founded the nonprofit Voice of the Wetlands Foundation (VOW) is to support outreach and education about Louisiana's Wetlands loss and how Louisiana's rich culture is also going away as its wetlands disappear.

He owns his own recording studio in Houma, Louisiana, and runs a record label, Whiskey Bayou Records. Benoit co-arranged and co-produced Alastair Greene's album, The New World Blues. The album was released on October 23, 2020.

Discography
1993 – Nice and Warm
1994 – What I Live For
1995 – Standing on the Bank
1997 – Live: Swampland Jam
1998 – Homesick for the Road with Kenny Neal, Debbie Davies
1999 – These Blues are All Mine
2001 – Wetlands
2002 – Whiskey Store with Jimmy Thackery
2003 – The Sea Saint Sessions
2004 – Whiskey Store Live with Jimmy Thackery
2005 – Fever for the Bayou
2005 – Voice of the Wetlands – Voice of the Wetlands Allstars
2006 – Brother to the Blues
2007 – Power of the Pontchartrain with Louisiana's LeRoux
2008 – Night Train To Nashville with Louisiana's LeRoux
2010 – Medicine
2011 – Box of Pictures – Voice of the Wetlands Allstars
2012 – Legacy: The Best Of

References

External links

Official website
VoiceoftheWetlands.com
Tab Benoit collection at the Internet Archive's live music archive

1967 births
Living people
Vandebilt Catholic High School alumni
Musicians from Baton Rouge, Louisiana
American blues guitarists
American male guitarists
Blues musicians from Louisiana
American blues singers
Electric blues musicians
Cajun people
People from Houma, Louisiana
Swamp blues musicians
Singers from Louisiana
Guitarists from Louisiana
20th-century American guitarists
20th-century American male musicians